Walter Brizuela Benitez  (born February 16, 1981 in Capital Federal, Argentina) is an Argentine footballer who was 2 times champion in his Argentinean professional career and also played internationally for Indonesia Super League. Now He's Currently Playing For Pro Duta FC in Indonesian Premier Division.

External links
 Walter Bruziela on deltras-fc.com
 Walter Brizuela at liga-indonesia.co.id

Living people
Argentine footballers
Expatriate footballers in Indonesia
Liga 1 (Indonesia) players
1981 births
Pelita Bandung Raya players
Association football midfielders